Fabian Hambüchen (also spelled Hambuechen; ; born 25 October 1987) is a retired German gymnast who was a four-time Olympian (2004,  2008, 2012, 2016) and was Olympic, World, and European champion. Fabian also won gold medals at European Games and at 2015 Summer Universiade. He has a full set of Olympics medals, one in each colour, as he is the 2016 Olympic champion, 2012 Olympic silver medalist and 2008 Olympic bronze medalist on the individual horizontal bar event. He became World champion on horizontal bar in 2007 Stuttgart.

Personal life 
Hambüchen was born 25 October 1987 in Bergisch Gladbach. He lives in Wetzlar. His was coached by his father Wolfgang Hambüchen. His ancestors were painters Georg Hambüchen and his father Wilhelm Hambüchen while his cousin is famous German publicist and lawyer Ulrich Hambüchen.

Career
Hambüchen's first major senior competition was the 2003 World Artistic Gymnastics Championships in Anaheim. He competed 4 events in qualifications but the German team did not advance to the team final.

Hambüchen was the youngest German athlete at the 2004 Summer Olympics in Athens where the German team placed 8th in the team event final. Individually, Hambüchen finished 23rd in the all-around and 7th in the horizontal bar individual event finals.

in 2005, Hambüchen won the horizontal bar title at the 2005 European Artistic Gymnastics Championships. At the 2005 World Artistic Gymnastics Championships, Hambüchen competed 3 events in qualifications and placed 4th in the horizontal bar individual event finals.

2006
Hambüchen competed at the 2006 European Artistic Gymnastics Championships where the German team placed 7th. Individually, 2005 European Artistic Gymnastics Championships placed 5th in the vault and 7th in the parallel bars individual event finals.

At the 2006 World Artistic Gymnastics Championships, Hambüchen won his first World Championship medal at the age of 18 with bronze in the all-around individual event final. He also won a bronze on vault despite having the lowest combined difficulty in the individual event final. The German team placed 7th in the team event final, with Hambüchen contributing scores on 5 events. However, Hambüchen did not qualify for the horizontal bar individual event final.

2007
In 2007, Hambüchen competed at the 2007 European Artistic Gymnastics Championships where he won the silver medal in the all-around and won the horizontal bar individual event title, the latter for the second time.

The 2007 World Artistic Gymnastics Championships was held in Stuttgart and the German team won the bronze medal in front of the home crowd, with Hambüchen contributing on 4 events. Individually, Hambüchen won the silver medal in the all-around individual event behind reigning world champion Yang Wei. He then won the gold medal in the horizontal bar individual event final, becoming world champion on that event. In the vault individual event final, he placed 5th.

In 2007, he was named the German Sportspersonality of the Year.

2008
At the 2008 European Artistic Gymnastics Championships the German team won the silver medal, with Hambüchen contributing on 5 events. He qualified for 4 individual event finals, winning the bronze medal on floor, placing 5th on both vault and parallel bars, and defending his European title on the horizontal bar, making it his second consecutive European title on that event and third overall.

Going into the 2008 Summer Olympics in Beijing, Hambüchen was considered the favourite for the horizontal bar title and a strong contender for an all-around medal. He qualified to 4 individual event finals including second into the all-around and was the top qualifier for the horizontal bar. The German team placed 4th in the team event final, with Hambüchen contributing scores on 5 events. However in the all-around individual event final, Hambüchen fell on the horizontal bar and placed 7th. He then placed 4th in the floor and parallel bars individual event finals. He then won his first Olympic Medal with a bronze in the horizontal bar individual event final.

2009
At the 2009 European Artistic Gymnastics Championships, Hambüchen won the individual all-around title and the floor title. He also placed 7th in the vault and won the bronze medal in parallel bars individual event finals. He did not qualify for the high bar individual event final. Hambüchen had to pull out of the 2009 World Artistic Gymnastics Championships due to an injury to his foot. He was considered a frontrunner for the all-around and horizontal bar titles.

2010
At the 2010 European Artistic Gymnastics Championships, Hambüchen contributed scores on 5 events towards the German team winning the European title. Individually, he placed 8th in the rings individual event final, and tied for the bronze medal with his teammate Philipp Boy in the horizontal bar individual event final. At the 2010 World Artistic Gymnastics Championships, Hambüchen did not compete in the all-around due to an injured Achilles tendon, but he contributed scores on 3 events to the German team's bronze medal. He also qualified to the parallel bars individual event final, placing 4th, and the horizontal bar individual event fina where he won the bronze medal.

2011
In January 2011, Hambüchen tore his Achilles tendon, which kept him out of competition at the 2011 European Artistic Gymnastics Championships in Berlin. He recovered in time for the 2011 World Artistic Gymnastics Championships where he once again contributed scores on 5 events in the team event final, and Germany finished 5th. He competed all 6 events in qualifications but did not advance to the all-around individual event final due to the rule that only 2 gymnasts from each country can advance to an individual event final, as Philipp Boy and Marcel Nguyen both qualified ahead of Hambüchen. He qualified to the horizontal bar individual event final where he placed 4th.

2012
In 2012, Hambüchen once again missed the European Championships, as he wanted to focus on preparation for the Olympics. 
At the 2012 Summer Olympics in London, he qualified 3rd into the all-round and 4th into the horizontal bar individual event final. He contributed scores on 5 events to the German team's 7th place finish. However, he had multiple large mistakes in the all-around individual event final, once again including a fall from the horizontal bar, finishing in 15th place. In the horizontal bar individual event final, he won his second Olympic medal, winning the silver behind Epke Zonderland of the Netherlands.

2013
At the 2013 European Artistic Gymnastics Championships, Hambüchen qualified to the horizontal bar individual event final but placed 6th after a fall. In July, he compete at the 2013 Summer Universiade where the German team placed 4th. Hambüchen won the silver medal in the all-around behind Russian Nikolai Kuksenkov, beating 2013 European Champion David Belyavskiy. He also won silver in the floor individual event final behind Japan's Ryohei Kato. He competed at the 2013 World Artistic Gymnastics Championships where he won the bronze medal in the all-around individual event final. He also finished in 7th place in the floor and won a silver medal in the horizontal bar individual event finals, once again in a close battle behind Zonderland.

2014
At the 2014 European Artistic Gymnastics Championships the German team finished in 4th, with Hambüchen once again contributing scores on 5 events to the team total. He qualified in second to the horizontal bar individual event final, but had a bad fall during the final and did not finish his routine, ending up in 8th place. At the 2014 World Artistic Gymnastics Championships, the German team finished in 8th place. Hambüchen also finished in 8th place in the all-around individual event final but did not qualify to the horizontal bar individual event final after falling in qualifications.

2015
Hambüchen did not compete in the 2015 European Artistic Gymnastics Championships. In June, he competed at the 2015 European Games where he finished 5th in the all-around and won the gold medal on the horizontal bar individual event finals. In July, he competed at the 2015 Summer Universiade where he won the gold medal on the horizontal bar individual event final. At the 2015 World Artistic Gymnastics Championships the German team did not qualify for the team final, and therefore missed automatic qualification for the 2016 Summer Olympics. Hambüchen qualified to the all-around individual event final in 27th place but withdrew due to illness. He also qualified to the horizontal bar individual event final in 4th place, but finished in 7th after executing a poor routine.

2016
Hambüchen was unable to compete for the first half of 2016 due to a shoulder injury. He was unable to compete in the Olympic test event where the German team secured their place for the 2016 Rio Olympics. Hambüchen returned to competition on three events (floor, vault and the horizontal bar) at the German Olympic trials. At the 2016 Summer Olympics in Rio de Janeiro, the German team placed seventh in the team final, with Hambüchen contributing on 3 events. He qualified in 1st place for the horizontal bar individual event final where he won his third Olympic medal and first Olympic gold, becoming the Olympic horizontal bar champion. With an Olympic gold medal in 2016, Hambüchen has completed the full collection set of horizontal bar medals in each colour at separate Olympics, improving his standings every subsequent four years from a bronze medal at the 2008 Beijing Olympics, then a silver medal at the 2012 London Olympics, and finally to the gold medal at the 2016 Rio Olympics.

Hambüchen retired after the 2016 Rio Olympics, stating that his Olympic title was "a dream come true".

He was inducted into the International Gymnastics Hall of Fame in 2022.

Competitive History

References

External links

 
 
 
 
 
 

1987 births
Living people
People from Bergisch Gladbach
Sportspeople from Cologne (region)
German male artistic gymnasts
Gymnasts at the 2004 Summer Olympics
Gymnasts at the 2008 Summer Olympics
Gymnasts at the 2012 Summer Olympics
Gymnasts at the 2016 Summer Olympics
Medalists at the World Artistic Gymnastics Championships
Olympic gymnasts of Germany
Olympic gold medalists for Germany
Olympic silver medalists for Germany
Olympic bronze medalists for Germany
Olympic medalists in gymnastics
Recipients of the Silver Laurel Leaf
Medalists at the 2016 Summer Olympics
Medalists at the 2012 Summer Olympics
Medalists at the 2008 Summer Olympics
Gymnasts at the 2015 European Games
European Games medalists in gymnastics
European Games gold medalists for Germany
European Games silver medalists for Germany
Universiade medalists in gymnastics
Universiade gold medalists for Germany
Universiade silver medalists for Germany
Medalists at the 2013 Summer Universiade
Medalists at the 2015 Summer Universiade
European champions in gymnastics